Fred Hornby was a film director and comedic actor in silent films. He also performed in theatrical productions.

In 1909 he was in The Soul Kiss show and in 1912 he appeared in the theater production Making Good. He directed some of DeWolf Hopper's comedy productions.

He traveled with John Bunny and filmed shorts along the way, including on the ship, and in England where the 1913 film The Pickwick Papers was shot on location. 

He worked at Vitagraph where he directed comedian Bunny before Bunny died of Bright's disease in 1915. Hornby was a director at National studio.

Filmography

Actor
Two Cinders (1912)
Leap Year Proposals (1912)
Thou Shalt Not Covet (1912 film) (1912)
A Bear Escape (1912), as Williams, circus owmer
The Adventure of Westgate Seminary (1913), as Mr Winkle
The Adventures of the Shooting Party (1913), as Mr. Winkle	
The Honourable Event (1913), as Winkle
The Pickwick Papers (1913 film), as Mr. Winkle
Tough Luck Smith (1914) as Rogers - Smith's Business Partner
In Dutch (1914 film) (1914) as Tom Smith
The Devil and Mrs. Walker (1914) as M. Henri - the French Barber
Tough Luck Smith (1914) as Rogers - Smith's Business Partner
Fatty and the Shyster Lawyer (1914) as O. K. Steel - Lawyer
The Widow's Might (1914 film) (1914) as Tom - the Nephew
A Wise Rube (1914) as Bill - Cy's City Cousin
Universal Ike in the Neglected Wife (1914) as The Detective
Universal Ike in Three of a Kind (1914)
Through the Keyhole (film) (1914) as Algernon Fortune - the Son
In Dutch (1914 film)
Fatty and the Shyster Lawyer (1914) as O. K. Steel - Lawyer
A Wise Rube (1914) as Bill - Cy's City Cousin
Universal Ike in the Neglected Wife (1914) as The Detective
Universal Ike in Three of a Kind (1914)
Universal Ike Junior at the Dance of Little L.O. (1914)
Universal Ike Junior on His Honeymoon (1914)
Universal Ike Junior's Legacy (1914)
Universal Ike Junior in His City Elopement (1914)
Universal Ike Junior in Cupid's Victory (1914)
Universal Ike Junior in Me, Him, and I (1914)
Universal Ike Junior in a Case on the Doctor (1914)
Universal Ike Junior Bearly Won Her (1914)
Universal Ike Junior Is Kept from Being an Actor (1914)
Universal Ike Junior in a Battle Royal (1914)
Universal Ike in Pursuit of Eats (1914)
Universal Ike Gets a Line on His Wife (1914)
Universal Ike Almost a Hero (1914)
Universal Ike and the School Belle (1914) as The Sheriff
Universal Ike Makes a Monkey of Himself (1914)
Universal Ike Has One Foot in the Grave (1914) as Sheriff Butternut 
No Account Count (1914), the Count
Universal Ike Jr..is Kept From Being an Actor (1914)
The Cowboy (1915)
The Cowboy and the Lady (1915)
The Mexican's Chickens (1915) as General Caramo
Mr. Pepperie Temper (1915) as Bill Andrews

Director
Call of the Hills (1923)

References

American male silent film actors
20th-century American male actors
American film directors